Bački Gračac is a village located in the Odžaci municipality, in the West Bačka District of Serbia. It is situated in the Autonomous Province of Vojvodina. The population of the village is 2,913 people (2002 census), of whom 2,810 are ethnic Serbs. This village is a former site of genocide.

Name

Old Serbian name of the village was Filipovo (Филипово). The modified versions of this Serbian name (Filipowa, Filipsdorf, Philipsdorf) were also used by Svabos/Shwoveh. Name was first recorded in the (presumably already modified) form Filipova in a document written in the time of the Hungarian King Béla III (1173–1196). Other names used for the village were: Filipovo Selo (in Serbian), Kindlingen, Sankt Philipp (in German), Szentfülöp, Szent-Fülöp (in Hungarian) and Filipovo (in Croatian).

History

During the Ottoman rule (16th-17th century), the village of Filipovo was mainly populated by ethnic Serbs. In 1652, there were 7 houses, and a monastery. Following the fall of the Ottoman Empire, the region became part of the Austrian-Hungarian empire.  The area having been depopulated by the lengthy Turkish wars, Germans citizens from Württemberg migrated to the area at the invitation of Empress Maria Theresa of Austria-Hungary, beginning in 1763. By 1764, 20 houses were built and soon a total of 60 houses were built with a population of 75 German families; by 1801, there were 272 houses. In the beginning of the 1900s there were 535 houses in the village.

In 1944 there were 5,280 Germans among 5,306 inhabitants. Most of the German inhabitants of the village were forcefully expelled and deported to camps and many murdered by Communist partisans in the brutality and chaos during and after WWII. 212 men, ages 16 to 65 were rounded up and shot on 25. November 1944.
The remaining population was placed in a concentration camp with little to no food and poor sanitation. Camps consisted of homes seized from the people and guarded by armed partisans. Many succumb to typhoid, dysentery, or starvation.

Historical population

 1880: 3,039
 1910: 3,881
 1921: 3,806
 1961: 4,284
 1971: 3,343
 1981: 2,996
 1991: 2,924
 2002: 2,913
 2011: 2,295
 2014: 2.273

Notable people
 Robert Zollitsch, a German prelate of the Roman Catholic Church. He formerly served as Archbishop of Freiburg im Breisgau and Chairman of the German Episcopal Conference.
 Peter Kupferschmidt, a German football player.

See also
Odžaci
West Bačka District
Bačka
Vojvodina
List of places in Serbia
List of cities, towns and villages in Vojvodina

References

Slobodan Ćurčić, Broj stanovnika Vojvodine, Novi Sad, 1996.

External links 

 Bački Gračac

Places in Bačka
West Bačka District
Odžaci